Cornisepta microphyma is a species of sea snail, a marine gastropod mollusk in the family Fissurellidae, the keyhole limpets.

Description
The shell grows to a height of 6 mm.

Distribution
This species occurs in the Atlantic Ocean off the Azores and on the Galicia Bank (Northeast Atlantic Ocean)

References

External links
  Serge GOFAS, Ángel A. LUQUE, Joan Daniel OLIVER,José TEMPLADO & Alberto SERRA (2021) - The Mollusca of Galicia Bank (NE Atlantic Ocean); European Journal of Taxonomy 785: 1–114

Fissurellidae
Gastropods described in 1896